Rigoberto was a 1945 Argentine comedy film.

Rigoberto is a masculine given name.

People

 Rigoberto Alpizar (1961–2005), Costa Rican-born United States citizen fatally shot by U.S. Federal Air Marshals
 Rigoberto Álvarez (born 1978), Mexican boxer
  (1860–1896), Nicaraguan journalist, soldier, and politician
 Rigoberto Calderón (born 1970), Nicaraguan track and field athlete and javelin thrower
 Rigoberto Chang Castillo (born 1950), Honduran lawyer and politician
 Rigoberto Cisneros (born 1953), Mexican football defender
  (born 1948), Colombian Catholic priest
 Rigoberto Cruz (died 1967), Nicaraguan co-founder of the Sandinista National Liberation Front, known as Pablo Ubeda
 Rigoberto Fontao Meza (1900–1936), Paraguayan poet
 Rigoberto Fontt (born 1925), Chilean sports shooter
  (born 1956), Panamanian boxer
 Rigoberto Gómez (born 1977), Honduran-Guatemalan football midfielder
 Rigoberto Gómez (Honduran footballer, born 1944), Honduran footballer known as "Shula"
 Rigoberto González (born 1970), American writer and book critic
 Rigoberto González González, Mexican politician
 Rigoberto Guzmán (1932–2014), Salvadoran football player and manager
 Rigoberto Hernandez (born 1967), American chemist and academic
 , Haitian filmmaker and artist
 Rigoberto López Pérez (1929–1956), Nicaraguan poet, artist, composer, and assassin of dictator Anastasio Somoza García
 Rigoberto Mendoza (disambiguation), several people
  (born 1935), Mexican politician
 Rigoberto Padilla (born 1985), Honduran footballer
 Rigoberto Paredes (1948–2015), Honduran poet, essayist, and publisher
 Rigoberto Pérez (born 1912), Mexican pole vaulter
 , Mexican director and screenwriter
 Rigoberto Riasco (1953-2022), Panamanian professional boxer also known as "Little Poison"
 Rigoberto Rivas (born 1998), Honduran football midfielder 
 Rigoberto Rivero (born 1914), Venezuelan sports shooter
 Rigoberto Rojas Suárez (1917–2001), Bolivian singer, musician and composer, better known as Tarateño Rojas
 Rigoberto Romero Carmona (1940–1991), Cuban photographer
 Rigoberto Salgado Vázquez (born 1969), Mexican economist politician
 Rigoberto Sanchez (born 1994), American football punter
 Rigoberto Soler (1896–1968), Spanish post-Impressionist painter
 Rigoberto Tiglao, Filipino diplomat and writer
 Rigoberto Torres (born 1960), Puerto Rican sculptor
 Rigoberto Trujillo (born 1978), Cuban judoka
 Rigoberto Urán (born 1987), Colombian professional road racing cyclist

See also
 Rigobert (name)
 Rigoberta Menchú (born 1959), K'iche' political and human rights activist from Guatemala

Masculine given names